Fife Central may mean or refer to:

 Central Fife (UK Parliament constituency)
 Fife Central (Scottish Parliament constituency)